FYS may refer to:
 Ferryside railway station, in Wales
 Fukushima Youth Sinfonietta, a Japanese orchestra
 Four Year Strong, an american rock band